Mpingo is a village in Ancuabe District in Cabo Delgado Province in northeastern Mozambique.

Geography 
It is located northeast of the district capital of Ancuabe.

Transport 

References

External links  
 Satellite map at Maplandia.com

Populated places in Ancuabe District